The Albergue Olímpico German Rieckehoff Sampayo or Olympic Hostel is an athletic training and recreational center located in Salinas, Puerto Rico.  It is the most complete sports center in Puerto Rico used by professional athletes and by the general public for health, educational, and recreational activities.

Among these: multiple use courts, baseball complex, aquatic complex, tennis complex, gyms and different sports halls. The Albergue also has water parks, an aviary, a botanical garden, playgrounds and the Puerto Rican Sports Museum. The museum houses the tomb holding the remains of legendary Puerto Rico Olympic leader Germán Rieckehoff Sampayo, his wife, Irma, and their son, renown equestrian athlete Juan Adolfo Rieckehoff.

The Albergue, which opened in 1985, hosted the Shooting competitions for the 2010 Central American and Caribbean Games. There are two Conference Halls and a Sport Library that bear Rafael Pont Flores's name.

References

Sports venues in Puerto Rico
2010 Central American and Caribbean Games venues
Salinas, Puerto Rico
1985 establishments in Puerto Rico